Interlaken is a census-designated place (CDP) in Santa Cruz County, California, United States. The population was 7,368 at the 2020 census.

Name
Named for the town of Interlaken in Switzerland meaning "among the lakes".

Geography
Interlaken is located at  (36.956293, -121.745433).

Climate

Interlaken has a warm summer Mediterranean climate (Köppen climate classification Csb) typical of coastal areas of California.
Annual precipitation averages  

There are an average of 63.4 days annually with measurable precipitation, most of which falls from October through May.  Summer fogs often produce light drizzle in the night and morning hours.  Condensation from the fogs also produces fog drip from trees overnight.  No measurable snowfall has been recorded since records began.

Demographics

2010
At the 2010 census Interlaken had a population of 7,321. The racial makeup of Interlaken was 3,856 (52.7%) White, 58 (0.8%) African American, 128 (1.7%) Native American, 302 (4.1%) Asian, 2 (0.0%) Pacific Islander, 2,573 (35.1%) from other races, and 402 (5.5%) from two or more races. Hispanic or Latino of any race were 5,261 persons (71.9%).

The census reported that 98.5% of the population lived in households and 1.5% lived in non-institutionalized group quarters.

There were 1,690 households, 885 (52.4%) had children under the age of 18 living in them, 1,075 (63.6%) were opposite-sex married couples living together, 227 (13.4%) had a female householder with no husband present, 123 (7.3%) had a male householder with no wife present.  There were 92 (5.4%) unmarried opposite-sex partnerships, and 11 (0.7%) same-sex married couples or partnerships. 179 households (10.6%) were one person and 88 (5.2%) had someone living alone who was 65 or older. The average household size was 4.27.  There were 1,425 families (84.3% of households); the average family size was 4.43.

The age distribution was 2,138 people (29.2%) under the age of 18, 853 people (11.7%) aged 18 to 24, 2,039 people (27.9%) aged 25 to 44, 1,658 people (22.6%) aged 45 to 64, and 633 people (8.6%) who were 65 or older.  The median age was 30.5 years. For every 100 females, there were 109.6 males.  For every 100 females age 18 and over, there were 106.7 males.

The homeowner vacancy rate was 0.7%; the rental vacancy rate was 1.8%. 68.6% of the population lived in owner-occupied housing units and 29.8% lived in rental housing units.

2000
At the 2000 census there were 7,328 people, 1,684 households, and 1,433 families in the CDP. The racial makeup of the CDP was 51.88% White, 1.01% African American, 1.28% Native American, 5.59% Asian, 0.07% Pacific Islander, 34.98% from other races, and 5.19% from two or more races. Hispanic or Latino of any race were 62.10%.

Of the 1,684 households 48.9% had children under the age of 18 living with them, 67.8% were married couples living together, 12.1% had a female householder with no husband present, and 14.9% were non-families. 10.3% of households were one person and 4.9% were one person aged 65 or older.  The average household size was 4.30 and the average family size was 4.44.

The age distribution was 32.3% under the age of 18, 11.7% from 18 to 24, 30.3% from 25 to 44, 18.0% from 45 to 64, and 7.6% 65 or older.  The median age was 29 years. For every 100 females, there were 107.0 males.  For every 100 females age 18 and over, there were 106.6 males.

The median household income was $53,875 and the median family income  was $50,756. Males had a median income of $25,644 versus $26,750 for females. The per capita income for the CDP was $13,791.  About 6.6% of families and 8.0% of the population were below the poverty line, including 5.6% of those under age 18 and 5.8% of those age 65 or over.

Government

References

External links

Census-designated places in Santa Cruz County, California
Census-designated places in California